Owlad-e Chelku (also Romanized as Owlād-e Chelkū; also known as Olād-e Chehelkūh) is a village in Dadin Rural District, Jereh and Baladeh District, Kazerun County, Fars Province, Iran. At the 2006 census, its population was 96, in 18 families.

References 

Populated places in Kazerun County